Basic Education Primary School No. 6 Lanmadaw is a public primary school in Yangon. The school's main colonial era building is a landmark protected by the city, and is listed on the Yangon City Heritage List.

References

Primary schools in Yangon